Keith Hamilton Basso (March 15, 1940 – August 4, 2013) was a cultural and linguistic anthropologist noted for his study of the Western Apaches, specifically those from the community of Cibecue, Arizona. Basso was professor emeritus of anthropology at the University of New Mexico and  earlier taught at the University of Arizona and Yale University.

After first studying Apache culture in 1959, Basso completed a bachelor's degree at Harvard University (B.A., 1962) and then took the doctorate at Stanford University (Ph.D., 1967). He was the son of novelist Hamilton Basso.

A classic contribution to ethnopoetics and the ethnography of speaking, Basso's 1979 book Portraits of the Whiteman examines complex cultural and political significance of jokes as a form of verbal art.

Basso was awarded the Victor Turner Prize for Ethnographic Writing in 1997 for his ethnography, Wisdom Sits in Places: Landscape and Language Among the Western Apache. The work was also the 1996 Western States Book Award Winner in Creative Nonfiction. In this ethnography, Basso expressed his hope that anthropologists will spend more time investigating how places and spaces are perceived and experienced; for human relationships to geographical places are rich, deeply felt, and profoundly telling.

Basso died from cancer on August 4, 2013, at the age of 73, in Phoenix, Arizona.

Works

Select bibliography
Heavy with Hatred: An Ethnographic Study of Western Apache Witchcraft (Ph.D. thesis, Stanford University, 1967)
Western Apache Witchcraft (1969)
The Cibecue Apache (1970, 1986)
Apachean Culture History and Ethnology, ed. Basso, Keith H, and Opler, Morris E. (1971)
 
Meaning in Anthropology, ed. Basso, Keith H, and Selby, Henry A. (1976)
Portraits of 'the Whiteman': Linguistic Play and Cultural Symbols among the Western Apache (1979)
Western Apache Language and Culture: Essays in Linguistic Anthropology (1992)
Wisdom Sits in Places: Landscape and Language among the Western Apache (1996)
Senses of Place, ed. Keith H. Basso and Steven Feld (1996)
Don’t Let the Sun Step Over You: A White Mountain Apache Family Life, 1860–1975 (2004), an oral history with Eva Tulene Watt

External links
Victor Turner Prize for Ethnographic Writing Winners, 1997

References

1940 births
2013 deaths
University of New Mexico faculty
American anthropologists
Cultural anthropologists
Anthropological linguists
Ethnographers
Stanford University alumni
Harvard University alumni
Linguists of Na-Dene languages
University of Arizona faculty
Yale University faculty